Gul Nawaz Warraich is a Pakistani politician who has served as the member of the Punjab Assembly.

References 

Politicians from Gujrat, Pakistan
Punjab MPAs 1985–1988
Punjab MPAs 1993–1996
Living people
Year of birth missing (living people)